Means Of Production is a compilation of Aim's early 12" and EP releases, recorded between 1995 and 1998.

Track listing
 "Loop Dreams" – 5:30
 "Diggin' Dizzy" – 5:33
 "Let the Funk Ride" – 5:11
 "Original Stuntmaster" – 6:33
 "Concentrate" – 5:51
 "Just Passin' Through" – 6:17
 "Soul Dive (All City mix)" – 7:06
 "Phantasm" – 6:15
 "Coast Road" – 3:56
 "Demonique" – 5:36

Album cover
The album's cover photograph depicts a locomotive from the fleet used to draw the Trans Siberian Express through Russia.

Personnel
 Aim – Arranger, Producer, Sleeve Art, Scratching
 Mandy Parnell – Mastering
 Steve Christian – Engineer, Mixing
 Mark Rae – Scratching

See also
 For more information on the track "Demonique", see Cold Water Music.

References
Track list and album cover information taken from Discogs.

2003 compilation albums
Aim (musician) albums
Grand Central Records compilation albums